André "Dida" Schervinski Amado (born 9 October 1983) is a Brazilian mixed martial artist and Muay Thai kickboxer who has competed in the Japanese promotions Dream and K-1 Hero's.

He is known for his exciting fighting style, often utilizing flying knees and spinning kicks, as well as his colorful entrances often sporting a mask and dancing his way to the ring. He is the head trainer of Evolução Thai.

Career

Amado made his professional debut in 2004, and started off his career 3-0-1 in his home country of Brazil before making his Japanese debut against future DREAM Featherweight Champion Hiroyuki Takaya for the K-1 Hero's organization. Amado received his first career loss against fellow Brazilian Gesias Calvacante by an armbar submission in the final of the 2007 K-1 Hero's Lightweight Grand Prix Tournament, Calvacante had won the tournament in the previous year as well.

Until late 2007 Amado trained at the Chute Boxe Academy in Curitiba, Brazil and was able to gain a purple belt BJJ under coach Cristiano Marcello during his time there. Amado formerly competed in K-1 HERO'S and entered the DREAM Lightweight Grand Prix, losing in the opening round of the tournament to Eddie Alvarez by first round TKO. He lost his last fight to Katsunori Kikuno at Dream 10 on 20 July 2009. "Dida" most recently faced former EliteXC Lightweight Champion K. J. Noons at DREAM.13 at 22 March 2010. He lost via unanimous decision.

In March 2014, Dida announced his plans to make a comeback to both MMA and kickboxing. He re-signed with K-1 in May 2014. On 16 July 2018, it was announced that Amado has signed with Rizin Fighting Federation and is expected to fight at the classic New Year's Eve card, namely Rizin 14.

Controversy
During the filming of The Ultimate Fighter: Brazil 3, Amado was brought in as one of the coaches under Wanderlei Silva. During the brawl that broke out between coaches Silva and Chael Sonnen, while the rest of the cast were trying to separate the brawling coaches, Amado joined in the crowd and took the chance to punch Sonnen on the back of the head several times and rip his shirt off. In the aftermath of the brawl, he was filmed bragging to his team about his deeds. UFC president Dana White kicked him off the show after the incident, telling the media that Amado "ought to be arrested" for what he did.

Mixed martial arts record

|-
|Loss
|align=center|6–4–1
|K. J. Noons
|Decision (unanimous)
|DREAM.13
|
|align=center|2
|align=center|5:00
|Yokohama, Japan
|
|-
|Loss
|align=center|6–3–1
|Katsunori Kikuno
|TKO (punches)
|DREAM.10
|
|align=center|1
|align=center|3:47
|Saitama, Saitama, Japan
|
|-
|Loss
|align=center|6–2–1
|Eddie Alvarez
|TKO (punches)
|Dream 1: Lightweight Grand Prix 2008 First Round
|
|align=center|1
|align=center|6:47
|Saitama, Saitama, Japan
|DREAM Lightweight Grand Prix opening round
|-
|Loss
|align=center|6–1–1
|Gesias Cavalcante
| Submission (armbar)
|Hero's 10
|
|align=center|1
|align=center|4:48
|Yokohama, Japan
|Hero's 2007 Lightweight Grand Prix final.
|-
|Win
|align=center|6–0–1
|Caol Uno
|Decision (unanimous)
|Hero's 10
|
|align=center|3
|align=center|5:00
|Yokohama, Japan
|Hero's 2007 Lightweight Grand Prix semi-final.
|-
|Win
|align=center|5–0–1
|Artur Oumakhanov
|TKO (punches)
|Hero's 9
|
|align=center|1
|align=center|1:20
|Yokohama, Japan
|Hero's 2007 Lightweight Grand Prix quarter-final.
|-
|Win
|align=center|4–0–1
|Hiroyuki Takaya
|TKO (broken nose)
|Hero's 8
|
|align=center|1
|align=center|3:29
|Nagoya, Japan
|
|-
|Win
|align=center|3–0–1
|Felipe Borges
|TKO (punches)
|Storm Samurai 12
|
|align=center|1
|align=center| 0:20
|Curitiba, Brazil
|
|-
| Draw
|align=center|2–0–1
|Claudio Mattos
| Draw
| Storm Samurai 8
|
|align=center| 3
|align=center| 5:00
|Brasílial, Brazil
|
|-
|Win
|align=center|2–0
|Sergio Vieira
|KO (punch)
|Storm Samurai 6
|
|align=center|1
|align=center|0:43
|Curitiba, Brazil
|
|-
|Win
|align=center|1–0
|Leandro Sousa
|Decision
|Storm Samurai 4
|
|align=center|3
|align=center|5:00
|Curitiba, Brazil
|
|}

Kickboxing record

|-  style="background:#cfc;"
| 2014-10-11 || Win ||align=left| Li Yankun || K-1 World MAX 2014 World Championship Tournament Final || Pattaya, Thailand || Decision (Majority) || 3 || 3:00 
|-  style="background:#fbb;"
| 2010-11-08 || Loss ||align=left| Hinata Watanabe || K-1 World MAX 2010 Final, Super Fight || Tokyo, Japan || Decision (Unanimous) || 3 || 3:00
|-  style="background:#fbb;"
| 2010-07-05 || Loss ||align=left| Yuichiro Nagashima || K-1 World MAX 2010 Final 16 – Part 1 || Tokyo, Japan || Decision (Majority) || 3 || 3:00
|-
! style=background:white colspan=9 |
|-  style="background:#fbb;"
| 2009-04-21 || Loss ||align=left| Buakaw Por. Pramuk || K-1 World MAX 2009 Final 16 || Fukuoka, Japan || Ext.R Decision (Unanimous) || 4 || 3:00
|-
! style=background:white colspan=9 |
|-  style="background:#cfc;"
| 2008-07-07 || Win ||align=left| Remigijus Morkevičius || K-1 World MAX 2008 Final 8, Super Fight || Tokyo, Japan || TKO (3 Knockdowns) || 1 || 1:43
|-  style="background:#fbb;"
| 2006-02-09 || Loss ||align=left| Hiroki Shishido || WSBA "Shoot Boxing 2006 Neo ΟΡΘΡΟΣ Series 1st" || Tokyo, Japan || Decision (Unanimous) || 5 || 3:00
|-
| colspan=9 | Legend:

See also
List of K-1 events
List of male kickboxers

References

External links

 Profile, fightmagazine.com

Living people
Brazilian male mixed martial artists
Lightweight mixed martial artists
Mixed martial artists utilizing Muay Thai
Mixed martial artists utilizing Brazilian jiu-jitsu
Brazilian Muay Thai practitioners
Brazilian practitioners of Brazilian jiu-jitsu
Brazilian male kickboxers
1983 births
Sportspeople from Curitiba